Gangni is an upazila of Meherpur District in the Division of Khulna, Bangladesh.

Geography 
It has 43922 households and total area 341.98 km2.

Main rivers are Bhairab, Kazla. Dharla and Ilangi Beels are notable. Gangni (town) consists of 5 mouzas.  It has a population of 19126; male 51.48% and female 48.95%. Literacy rate among the town people is 28.8%.Administration Gangni thana, now an upazila, was established in 1923. It consists of 9 union parishads, 100 mouzas, 136 village, 5 border outpost.

Gangni Upazila is bounded by Daulatpur Upazila in Kushtia District, on the north, Daulatpur, Mirpur Upazilas in Kushtia District, and Alamdanga Upazila in Chuadanga District on the east, Alamdanga Upazila in Chuadanga District and Meherpur Sadar Upazila in Meherpur District, on the south and Karimpur II and Tehatta I CD Blocks, in Nadia District, West Bengal, India, on the west.

Demographics 
According to 2011 Bangladesh census, Gangni had a population of 299,607. Males constituted 49.48% of the population and females 50.52%. Muslims formed 98.615% of the population, Hindus 0.910%, Christians 0.438%, and others 0.037%. Gangni had a literacy rate of 42.21% for the population 7 years and above.

At the 1991 Bangladesh census, Gangni had a population of 229,138, of whom 117,027 were aged 18 or older. Males constituted 51.05% of the population, and females 48.95%. Gangni had an average literacy rate of 21% (7+ years), against the national average of 32.4%.

Arts and culture 
Public library 4, rural club 10, playground 20. Main occupations Agriculture 38.19%, agricultural labourer 33.75%, wage labourer 4.43%, commerce 12.48%, construction 1%, service 2.7%, others 7.45%.Land use Cultivable land 26.545 hectare; fallow land 38 hectare; single crop 13.4%, double crop 67.5%, triple crop 19.2%; land under irrigation 54%.Land control Among the peasants, 14.29% are rich, 50.79% intermediate and 34.92% small; cultivable land per head 0.15 hectare.,

Football is a popular sports for the people in the upazila, young generation is attracted by the cricket. Men wear Lungi whether women prefer Sari.

Points of interest 
Shaharbati Neelkuthi (1859) and Gosaidubi Mosque at Karamdi. Marks of War of Liberation Mass grave 2 (Kazipur and Tepukhali playground). There is a hundred of ponds at the village Sholotaka where fish is cultivated commercially

Administration
Gangni Upazila is divided into Gangni Municipality and nine union parishads: Bamondi, Dhankolla, Kathuli, Kazipur, Motmura, Raipur, Shaharbati, Sholotaka, and Tentulbaria. The union parishads are subdivided into 90 mauzas and 137 villages.

Gangni Municipality is subdivided into 9 wards and 29 mahallas.

Education 
Old educational institutions are Hoglabaria High School and Gangni High School.

See also
 Upazilas of Bangladesh
 Districts of Bangladesh
 Divisions of Bangladesh

References

 
Upazilas of Meherpur District